John Naimbanna (17??–1793) was a Temne Prince who visited London in 1791–1793.

John was the son of Naimbanna II, the Obai (King) of the Temne people of Robanna, near Sierra Leone. The king had three sons and resolved to send one each to Britain, Portugal and the Ottoman Empire to study Protestantism, Catholicism and Islam respectively. Thus in 1791 John was sent to England on the small merchant sloop Lapwing. There he came under the tutelage of the reformer Henry Thornton. While in London he became a Christian, adopting the forenames Henry and Granville to honour Henry Thornton and Granville Sharp.

Naimbanna died of unknown causes in July 1793.

References

1793 deaths
Year of birth unknown
Temne people
Black British history